Pleiotropic regulator 1 is a protein that in humans is encoded by the PLRG1 gene.

Interactions
PLRG1 has been shown to interact with CDC5L.

References

Further reading